James Kerr (born 17 January 1959) is a Scottish former professional footballer who played as a midfielder.

References

1959 births
Living people
Scottish Football League players
Scottish footballers
Sportspeople from Rutherglen
Dundee United F.C. players
Airdrieonians F.C. (1878) players
Raith Rovers F.C. players
Brechin City F.C. players
Falkirk F.C. players
Hamilton Academical F.C. players
Partick Thistle F.C. players
Stirling Albion F.C. players
Albion Rovers F.C. players
Arbroath F.C. players
Association football midfielders
Scottish Junior Football Association managers
Scottish football managers
Footballers from South Lanarkshire